The  self-schema refers to a long lasting and stable set of memories that summarize a person's beliefs, experiences and generalizations about the self, in specific behavioral domains. A person may have a self-schema based on any aspect of themselves as a person, including physical characteristics (body image), personality traits and interests, as long as they consider that aspect of their self to be important to their own self-definition. When someone has a schema about themselves they hyper focus on a trait about themselves and believe what they say to themselves about that specific trait. A self schema can be good or bad depending on what that person talks to themselves about and in what kind of tone. 

For example, someone will have a self-schema of extroversion if they think of themselves as extroverted and also believe that their extroversion is central to who they are. Their self-schema for extroversion may include general self-categorizations ("I am sociable."), beliefs about how they would act in certain situations ("At a party I would talk to lots of people") and also memories of specific past events ("On my first day at university I made lots of new friends").

General 

The term schematic describes having a particular schema for a particular dimension. For instance, a person in a rock band at night would have a "rocker" schema. However, during the day, if he works as a salesperson, he would have a "salesperson" schema during that period of time. Schemas vary according to cultural background and other environmental factors.

Once people have developed a schema about themselves, there is a strong tendency for that schema to be maintained by a bias in what they attend to, in what they remember, and in what they are prepared to accept as true about themselves.  In other words, the self-schema becomes self-perpetuating. The self-schema is then stored in long-term memory, which both facilitates and biases the processing of personally relevant information. Individuals who form a self-schema of a person with good exercise habits will then in return exercise more frequently.

Self-schemas vary from person to person because each individual has very different social and cultural life experiences. A few examples of self-schemas are: exciting or dull; quiet or loud; healthy or sickly; athletic or nonathletic; lazy or active; and geek or jock. If a person has a schema for "geek or jock," for example, he might think of himself as a bit of a computer geek and would possess a lot of information about that trait. Because of this, he would probably interpret many situations based on relevance to his being a computer geek.

Another person with the "healthy or sickly" schema might consider themselves a very health conscious person. Their concern with being healthy would then affect everyday decisions such as what groceries they buy, what restaurants they frequent, or how often they exercise. Women who are schematic on appearance exhibited worse body image, lower self-esteem, and more negative mood than did those who are aschematic on appearance.

The term aschematic means not having a schema for a particular dimension. This usually occurs when people are not involved with or concerned about a certain attribute. For example, if a person plans on being a musician, a self-schema in aeronautics will not apply to him; he is aschematic on aeronautics.

Childhood creation
Early in life, we are exposed to the idea of the self from our parents and other figures. We begin to take on a very basic self-schema, which is mostly limited to a "good child" or "bad child" schema—that is, we see ourselves in unambiguously positive or negative terms. It is in childhood that we begin to offer explanations for our actions, which reasoning creates the more complicated concept of the self: a child will begin to believe that the self caused their behaviors, deciding on what motivations to offer as explanations of behavior.

Multiple 
Most people have multiple self-schemas, however this is not the same as multiple personalities in the pathological sense. Indeed, for the most part, multiple self-schemas are extremely useful to people in daily life. Subconsciously, they help people make rapid decisions and behave efficiently and appropriately in different situations and with different people. Multiple self-schemas guide what people attend to and how people interpret and use incoming information. They also activate specific cognitive, verbal, and behavioral action sequences – called scripts and action plans in cognitive psychology – that help people meet goals efficiently.
Self-schemas vary not only by circumstances and who the person is interacting with, but also by mood. Researchers found that we have mood-congruent self-schemas that vary with our emotional state.

The body
The self's relationship with and understanding of the body is an important part of self-schema. Body schema is a general term that has multiple definitions in various disciplines. Generally, it refers to a person's concept of his or her own body, where it is in space, what it looks like, how it is functioning, etc.

Our body image is part of our self-schema. The body image includes the following:
The perceptual experience of the body
The conceptual experience of the body—what we have been told and believe about our body, including scientific information, hearsay, myth, etc.
The emotional attitude towards the body

Our body schemata may transcend the realities of what our bodies actually are—or in other words, we may have a different mental picture of our bodies than what they physically are. This is evidenced when individuals who lose limbs have phantom limb sensations. Individuals who lose a limb may still feel like they have that limb. They may even feel in that limb sensations from other limbs.

An example of someone having a self schema or belief, is if someone has a contorted belief of what their body looks like which can lead to body dysmorphia. If they think of themselves as or have been told that they are "too fat," or "too skinny," they will believe that. They will also believe that this contorted version of themselves is actually them. People who possess this self schema might tell themselves negative things to make them feel bad about themselves.

Effect of illness
Individuals afflicted with both physical and mental illness have more negative self-schemata. This has been documented in patients suffering from such illnesses as depression and irritable bowel syndrome. Sufferers tend to identify themselves with their illness, unconsciously associating the negative traits of the illness itself with themselves.

See also
 Behavioural confirmation
 Identity (social science)
 List of maladaptive schemas
 Outline of self
 Self-image
 Self-perception theory

Notes

References 
 Wilderdom, (2003 Oct 21). Role of schemas in personality. Retrieved March 4, 2009, from Wilderdom - a project in natural living & transformation Web site: http://wilderdom.com/personality/L11-1RoleOfSchemasInPersonality.html
 Kristin Valentino,  Dante Cicchetti,  Fred A Rogosch, Sheree L Toth. (2008). True and false recall and dissociation among maltreated children: The role of self-schema. Development and Psychopathology, 20(1), 213-32.  Retrieved March 3, 2009, from Research Library database. (Document ID: 1601417001).
 Cervone, D., & Pervin, L. (2008) Personality Theory and Research. Hoboken: John Wiley & Sons, Inc.
 Kassin, S., Fein, S., & Markus, H. (2008). Social Psychology Seventh Edition. Boston: Houghton Mifflin Company.
 Bartoli, Angela (2008, Jan. 14). Self schema. Retrieved March 3, 2009, from Angela M. Bartolli, Psychology Web site: http://webspace.ship.edu/ambart/PSY_220/selfschemaol.htm
 3-S, (2003). What is a self-schema?. Retrieved March 3, 2009, from The Spiritual Self-Schema Development Program Web site: https://medicine.yale.edu/spiritualselfschema/
Identity (social science)
Conceptions of self
Epistemology
Epistemology of science
Self
Social psychology